85 Combat Flying School is a unit of the South African Air Force (SAAF). It is a jet flight-training and combat operations school, it was first formed in 1982 at AFB Pietersburg (It was known as Advanced Flying School from 1967). It relocated to AFB Hoedspruit on 1 January 1993 due to the closure of AFB Pietersburg. The school also has a wartime reserve role, although it has publicly been stated that the school will not be used operationally unless a very urgent need arises.

Aircraft used previously :
Mirage IIIEZ/DZ/D2Z
Canadair Sabre Mk.6 1975 - 1980
Atlas Impala Mk.I/II 1972 - 2005

The school has been relocated to AFB Makhado from AFB Hoedspruit into a new purpose-built facility with state-of-the-art computer-aided flight training instruments. The school shares this facility with the SAAF Gripen community.

During October 2007 there were several pilots that went solo on the Hawk Mk.120.

The squadron also participated in the annual South Africa National Defence Force preparation exercises and fired live cannon rounds and dropped live bombs. They also had a successful weapons deployment exercise to AFB Bloemspruit in 2007.

References

Squadrons of the South African Air Force
Military education and training in South Africa
Training units and formations of air forces
Military units and formations established in 1982
Military history articles needing attention to coverage and accuracy